The northern black flycatcher (Melaenornis edolioides) is a small passerine bird in the flycatcher family, Muscicapidae.

Range 
This is an insectivorous species which is a resident breeder in tropical Africa from Senegal to Ethiopia and south to Zaire and Tanzania.

Habitat 
The northern black flycatcher is found in moist wooded areas and cultivation. It nests in a hole or reuses the old nest of another species, and lays two or three eggs. Breeding takes place in the wet season.

Description 
It is a large upright long-tailed flycatcher. The adult is uniformly black. Juveniles are blackish-brown with buff scaling.

The long square-ended tail helps to distinguish this species from two other all-black insectivores, the fork-tailed drongo and the shorter-tailed and red-eyed common square-tailed drongo.

Song 
This flycatcher has a simple musical song and a thin tsee-whee call.

References

 Birds of The Gambia by Barlow, Wacher and Disley, 

northern black flycatcher
Birds of Sub-Saharan Africa
northern black flycatcher